Sayad (also, Sayat) is a village and municipality in the Khachmaz Rayon of Azerbaijan.  It has a population of 1,247.  The municipality consists of the villages of Sayad and İlxıçı.

References 

Populated places in Khachmaz District